The women's 100 metres hurdles event at the 2003 European Athletics U23 Championships was held in Bydgoszcz, Poland, at Zawisza Stadion on 18 and 20 July.

Medalists

Results

Final
20 July
Wind: 1.0 m/s

Semifinals
20 July
Qualified: first 4 in each to the Final

Semifinal 1
Wind: -0.2 m/s

Semifinal 2
Wind: 1.2 m/s

Heats
18 July
Qualified: first 3 in each heat and 4 best to the Final

Heat 1
Wind: -1.7 m/s

Heat 2
Wind: -1.4 m/s

Heat 3
Wind: 1.6 m/s

Heat 4
Wind: -0.1 m/s

Participation
According to an unofficial count, 27 athletes from 16 countries participated in the event.

 (1)
 (2)
 (1)
 (2)
 (2)
 (2)
 (1)
 (2)
 (3)
 (1)
 (1)
 (3)
 (1)
 (1)
 (2)
 (2)

References

100 metres hurdles
Sprint hurdles at the European Athletics U23 Championships